Guillermo José Lovell (January 14, 1918 – October 25, 1967) was an Argentine heavyweight boxer. He competed at the 1936 Berlin Olympics and won a silver medal, losing by points to Herbert Runge in the final. His elder brother Alberto Lovell and nephew Pedro were also Olympic boxers.

1936 Olympic results
Below are Guillermo Lovell's bouts from the 1936 Olympic boxing tournament in Berlin.  Lovell competed in the heavyweight division for Argentina.

 Round of 16: defeated Omar Hermansen (Denmark) on points
 Quarterfinal: defeated Jose Feans (Uruguay) by a second-round knockout
 Semifinal: Defeated Erling Nilson (Norway) on points
 Final: lost to Herbert Runge (Germany) on points (was awarded a silver medal)

References

External links

 Guillermo Lovell's profile at databaseOlympics
 

1918 births
1967 deaths

Heavyweight boxers
Olympic boxers of Argentina
Boxers at the 1936 Summer Olympics
Olympic silver medalists for Argentina
Argentine people of Irish descent
Olympic medalists in boxing
Medalists at the 1936 Summer Olympics
Argentine male boxers
Sportspeople from Buenos Aires Province